Gamaliel Bailey (December 3, 1807June 5, 1859) was an American physician who left that career to become an abolitionist journalist, editor, and publisher, working primarily in Cincinnati, and Washington, D.C. Anti-abolitionist mobs attacked his offices in both cities during the 1840s.

Biography
Born and raised in Mount Holly Township, New Jersey, in 1807, Bailey moved with his family to Philadelphia at the age of nine. He was educated at home and in local schools.

Bailey graduated from the Jefferson Medical College, Philadelphia, in 1827. He moved to Baltimore, where he served as editor of the Methodist Protestant, a religious journal.

In 1831, Bailey moved to Cincinnati, where he set up a medical practice. He also lectured on physiology at the Lane Theological Seminary. Attending the Lane Debates on Slavery in February 1834 between pro- and anti-slavery students, he became an ardent abolitionist. The anti-slavery students withdrew from the seminary in protest for its condemnation of abolitionism.

In 1836, Bailey joined James G. Birney in the editorial control of The Philanthropist, the official newspaper of the Ohio Anti-Slavery Society. The following year he succeeded Birney as editor. He directed the paper in publishing anti-slavery articles until 1847, in spite of threats and acts of violence — the printing office of The Philanthropist was wrecked three times by pro-slavery mobs.

Beginning in 1843, Bailey also edited a daily paper, the Herald. In 1847, he assumed control of the new abolitionist publication, The National Era, in Washington, D.C. His offices were attacked by pro-slavery mobs; in 1848, he and his printers were under siege for three days as a mob held them hostage. This paper had a considerable circulation nationally. In 1851–1852, it published Harriet Beecher Stowe's novel, Uncle Tom's Cabin, in serial form.

In December 1854, Bailey helped to persuade Montgomery Blair to represent Dred Scott in his Supreme Court case pro bono, by agreeing to underwrite his expenses. By May 11, 1857, the Scott case had incurred $63.18 in court costs and $91.50 for the printing of briefs. Bailey asked the 75 Republican members of Congress to contribute $2.00 each and covered the rest himself.

In 1859, Bailey died at the age of 51 at sea, aboard the steamship Arago, while en route to Europe. His body was originally buried in Congressional Cemetery in Washington, D.C. His wife, Margaret Lucy Shands Bailey, died in 1888 and was buried at Oak Hill Cemetery, across the city. Bailey's son, Marcellus, had his father's remains disinterred and reburied in an unmarked grave next to Margaret.

Writings

References

Bibliography

External links 
 Gamaliel Bailey Correspondence at the Princeton University Library Special Collections

1807 births
1859 deaths
19th-century American physicians
19th-century American newspaper editors
American abolitionists
American Methodists
Burials at Oak Hill Cemetery (Washington, D.C.)
Lane Theological Seminary faculty
Writers from Cincinnati
People from Mount Holly, New Jersey
Writers from Philadelphia
People who died at sea
Jefferson Medical College alumni
Methodist abolitionists